The Voice of Mongolia is a Mongolian reality talent show that aims to discover new singing talents. The first season, premiered on January 21, 2018 on Mongol HDTV. The series is part of the franchise The Voice and is based on a similar competition format in the Netherlands, The Voice of Holland. The series was created by Dutch television producer John de Mol. It is part of an international series. The winner receives ₮100,000,000 ($38,000) amount of a record deal with Universal Music Group's Mongolian official representative, Mongol Content LLC, and a Nissan Qashqai. Otgonbayar Damba (Otgoo), Bold Dorjsuren (Bold), Ulambayar Davaa (Uka), Ononbat Sed (Ononbat) are the coaches. Each team of singers are mentored and developed by their coach. In the second stage, coaches have two of their team members battle against each other by singing the same song, with the coach choosing which team member to advance. In the final phase, the remaining contestants of a team, compete against each other in live broadcasts. The television audience helps to decide who advances. When one remains for each coach, the four contestants compete against each other in the finale.

Enguun Tseyendash was announced as the winner of the season, beating Team Otgoo's Bolormaa A, Team Bold's Ariunjargal Jantsannorov & Team Ononbat's Usukhbayar Batsaikhan, marking Uka's first win as a coach.

Coaches & Hosts 

In late 2017, Mongol TV began announcements of the coaches for the series. First to sign on were Mongolian rock band Hurd's guitarist Otgonbayar Damba and pop singer Bold Dorjsuren. On'n Off Production's headman Ononbat Sed came on board in August 2017. Pop band Kiwi's singer, actress Ulambayar Davaa was added as the final coach a week later.

Uuganbayar Enkhbat & Ankhbayar Ganbold were announced as the show's hosts. The two actors had previously hosted all two seasons of Mongol TV's Mongolia's Got Talent together.

Teams

Color key

Blind Auditions

Color key

Episode 1 (January 21)
The first Blind Audition taped episode was broadcast on January 21, 2018. The coaches performed Queen song, "We Will Rock You" at the start of the show.

Episode 2 (January 28)

Episode 3 (February 4)

Episode 4 (February 11)

Episode 5 (February 18)

Episode 6 (February 25)

Episode 7 (March 4)

Episode 8 (March 11)
The last Blind Audition episode was broadcast on March 11, 2018. Ononbat & Uka were turned their 17th contestant, and the contestants choose them for their coaches.

The Battles
After the Blind Auditions, each coach had sixteen to seventeen contestants for the battle rounds that aired from March 25 to April 15, 2018. Each episode featured eight battles consisting of pairings from within each team, and each battle concluding with the respective coach eliminating one of the two or three contestants; the eight winners for each coach advanced to the next round. Team Ononbat performed Queen song, "Bohemian Rhapsody" at the start of the battles.

Color key

The knockouts
After the battle rounds, each coach had eight contestants for the knockouts that aired from April 28 to May 6. Each day, only one team's contestants performed in order, and when they all performed over, the public voted for their favorite contestants. The most voted two contestants advanced to the quarter-finals. After, the team's coach had to choose two of the remaining 6 contestants. Then each coach had 4 contestants in the quarter-finals.

Color key:

Week 1: Team Uka

Week 1: Team Bold

Week 2: Team Otgoo

Team Ononbat (May 6)

Quarter-finals (Mongolian songs) 
The quarter-finals aired from May 12 to the 13th. Each coach had 4 contestants on their team. In the quarter-finals, the remaining 16 contestants sang only Mongolian songs, respectively. Two teams' contestants performed in one day. After the first team's performances, the coach had to choose only one contestant, who advanced to the next round. After that, the public voted remaining 3 contestants. The most voted contestant advanced to the next round.

Color key:

Week 3: Team Ononbat & Team Uka

Week 3: Team Bold & Team Otgoo

Semi-finals 
The semi-finals aired on May 20. Each coach had 2 contestants in their team. After the first team's performances, the public voted for their favorite contestants for only 5 minutes, and the most voted contestant advanced to the finals. Each coach had 1 contestant in the finals.

Color key

Week 4

Finals 
 Color key

  — Winner
  — Runner-up
  — Third/Fourth place

In the final rounds, (aired May 27 - last day of the season 1) each coach had 1 contestant in his/her team. Bolormaa from Team Otgoo, Ariunjargal from Team Bold, Enguun from Team Uka, Usuhbayar from Team Ononbat. First, the artists performed in order, then Public's Voting system's 1st round is opening, while the artists performing with their coaches, singing only Mongolian songs. Then the most-voted 2 contestants advanced to the next voting round. After, Public's Voting system's round 2 is opening, Public can vote only remaining 2 contestants.

Elimination Chart

Overall 

 Color key
 Artist's info

Result details

Team
Color key
Artist's info

Result Details

References

External links
 Voice of Mongolia Webpage
 Voice of Mongolia Official Facebook
 Voice of Mongolia Official YouTube Channel

The Voice of Mongolia